The Coal Creek Covered Bridge was on the east side of Lodi, Indiana. The Burr Arch single span style bridge crossed Coal Creek and was built by J. J. Daniels in 1869. It was destroyed by arson on June 28, 1992.

History
The Parke County Commissioners paid J. J. Daniels $2.25 in 1873 to inspect the bridge. In 1874 the embankment was repaired. He would later return in 1898 to do further repairs to the bridge after it had received some major damage. He said that it was harder to do the repairs the bridge than it had been to build it originally.

See also
 Parke County Covered Bridges
 Parke County Covered Bridge Festival

References

Former covered bridges in Parke County, Indiana
Bridges completed in 1869
Covered bridges in the United States destroyed by arson
Buildings and structures demolished in 1992
Bridges Built by J. J. Daniels
1869 establishments in Indiana
Wooden bridges in Indiana
Burr Truss bridges in the United States
Road bridges in Indiana